Clarecastle GAA is a Gaelic Athletic Association club in the village of Clarecastle in County Clare, Ireland.

In existence since 1887.

Major honours

Hurling
 Munster Senior Club Hurling Championship (1): 1997
 Clare Senior Hurling Championship (12): 1928 (with Ennis Dalcassians), 1943, 1945, 1949, 1970, 1986, 1987, 1991, 1994, 1997, 2003, 2005
 Clare Intermediate Hurling Championship (1): 1931
 Clare Junior A Hurling Championship (2): 1985, 2012
 Clare Under-21 A Hurling Championship (4): 1995, 1996, 1999, 2000

Gaelic Football
 Clare Senior Football Championship (1): 1908
 Clare Intermediate Football Championship (3): 1984, 1993, 1998
 Clare Junior A Football Championship (3): 1936, 1982, 2012

History
The name "Clár Átha an Dá Choradh" has its origins in the local medieval castle first built around 1250 and reconstructed and fortified in the late 15th century. The castle is built on a site, which was an island formed by a divide in the river Fergus. In the Irish Annals, the place is called "Clár Átha an Dá Choradh" or ‘the board of the ford of the two weirs’. The shortened form of this place name "An Clár" in the anglicised form eventually gave its name to the modern county of Clare.

Hurling and football have been played in the parish since earliest times but its present existence dates probably from the spring of 1887. A football tournament is recorded as having taken place in October of that year. It is also on record that the Killone hurling club and the Clarecastle football club took part in a funeral procession of a Clarecastle Fenian in March 1888.

There have been many changes since those times. The name of the club in Clarecastle has been changed many times from "Robert Emmets", "Parnells" to "An Clar", "An Clar Mor", "Droichead an Chlair" etc., until 1971 when the historic name of "Clár Átha an Dá Choradh" was restored to the club and has remained ever since.

The club remained without a home ground until the early 1980s when a first permanent site was purchased from St Flannan's College at Clareabbey. That well-appointed grounds and clubhouse has since passed from the club in a roundabout way to the Clare County Board. It was purchased from the club by the Ennis Urban Council in 1998 and subsequently bought back from the Urban Council by the county board and is now the official headquarters of Clare GAA.

The clubs present location, back in the heart of the village, is the fruit of necessity, foresight, effort, persuasion and a bit of luck on the part of club members and the generosity and community spirit of the Roughan and Ryan families. We are justifiably proud of this achievement. It consists of a clubhouse opened in 2002 and five playing pitches (three full size and two junior fields) first used in 2001. This development will serve the club and community well into the future and is constantly being upgraded to now include an indoor training facility for club members.

On the playing field, having joined up temporarily with their neighbours Ennis Dalcassians, they won the 1928 Clare Senior Hurling Championship for the first time. The club then contested three finals as an independent club in the 1930s, before their breakthrough in the county finally came in 1943 with a win over Scariff.  Successes followed in ’45, ‘49, ’70, ’86, ’87, ’91, ’94, ’97, 2003 and 2005.  In between, 12 finals were contested and lost. In 1997, Clarecastle also made the historic breakthrough in Munster with victory over Patrickswell, following final defeats in 1970 and ’86, and were subsequently unfortunate to lose in a replay to a great Birr team at the All-Ireland semi-final stage.

While no county senior championship has been garnered since 2005, there have been several indicators that the future is indeed bright for the Magpies as in the past two years, hurling championship titles have been achieved at Minor A (2013), Under 21B (2013), Junior A (2012) and Junior C (2013).

On the football front, the club have also witnessed a resurgence at adult level following a County Junior A Championship victory in 2012. That success ensured a first representation at Munster level and the club now field adult teams at Intermediate, Junior B and Under 21 levels.
In the past, Clarecastle claimed the Intermediate Football Championship in 1984, 1993 and last won it in 1998 while at senior level, the only championship secured was in the early days of the club in 1908.

Clarecastle also possesses thriving Camogie, Ladies Football and Handball Clubs, with 2014 seeing a greater alliance between all five codes in an effort to serve all members of the community under the one umbrella in the coming years.

Hurling
Clarecastle has been the home to many hurlers, among those All-Stars Johnny Callinan (1979, 1981) Anthony Daly (1994, 1995, 1998) and Ger 'Sparrow' O'Loughlin (1995, 1997). Six Clarecastle players featured in Clare's All-Ireland Senior Hurling breakthrough of 1995: Daly and O'Loughlin along with Fergie Tuohy, Alan Neville, Kenny Morrissey and Stephen Sheedy. Jonathan Clancy, Stephen O'Halloran and Patrick Kelly were part the 2013 All-Ireland Senior Panel that bridged a 13-year gap.

Notable players
 John Callinan
 Jonathan Clancy
 Anthony Daly
 Haulie Daly
 Bobby Duggan
 Tom Howard
 Mick Murphy
 Alan Neville
 Ger O'Loughlin
 Paschal Russell
 Fergus Tuohy
 Stephen O’Halloran
 Patrick Kelly
 Killian McDermott

References

External links
Official Clarecastle GAA Club website

Hurling clubs in County Clare
Gaelic football clubs in County Clare
Gaelic games clubs in County Clare